Lake Ezerische is lake in Haradok district, Vitebsk Voblast of Belarus and is situated at the border with the Pskov Oblast of the Russia. In 1959, on the river flowing out of Lake a hydroelectric power plant was built. This led to the raising of the water level (as the lake began to function as a reservoir). Raising the water level leads to erosion of its banks. The lake is dated to the Glacial period and is about 10,000 years. The largest settlement on the bank of the lake is Ezerische a settlement located on the western shore of the lake. On one of the islands in Lake located Ezerishche Castle. Up to the present day only ramparts of the castle preserved.

Lakes of Pskov Oblast